Sicilian refers to the autonomous Italian island of Sicily.

Sicilian can also refer to:

 Sicilian language, a Romance language spoken on the island of Sicily, its satellite islands, and southern Calabria
 Sicilians, people from or with origins in Sicily
 Sicilian Defence, a chess opening
 The Sicilian, a 1984 novel by Mario Puzo
 The Sicilian (film), a 1987 action film based on the novel

See also
 
 Caecilian, an order of amphibians, occasionally pronounced Sicilian
 Sicily (disambiguation)

Language and nationality disambiguation pages